Lord Selkirk Provincial Park is a provincial park in Prince Edward Island, Canada. The park hosts a community-operated campground and playground. It is adjacent to the Belfast Highland Greens golf course, in addition to a pool and a canteen.

References

Provincial parks of Prince Edward Island
Parks in Queens County, Prince Edward Island